Lee Ho (born 14 November 1976) is a South Korean rower. He competed in the men's double sculls event at the 1996 Summer Olympics.

References

External links
 

1976 births
Living people
South Korean male rowers
Olympic rowers of South Korea
Rowers at the 1996 Summer Olympics
Place of birth missing (living people)